The manga Captain Tsubasa is written and illustrated by Yōichi Takahashi. The series focuses on the development of a young football (soccer) player Tsubasa Oozora. The series was serialized in Shueisha magazine Weekly Shōnen Jump between 1981 and 1988 for a total of 37 tankōbon volumes. A direct sequel titled Captain Tsubasa: World Youth was released between 1994 and 1997 by Shueisha. Others sequels were serialized in the same publisher Weekly Young Jump magazine since 2001: Road to 2002 (2001–2004), Golden-23 (2005–2008),  and Kaigai Gekito Hen (2009–2012). Since 2013, Rising Sun is serialized in Shueisha's Grand Jump magazine.

Volume list

Captain Tsubasa

World Youth

Road to 2002

Golden 23

Kaigai Gekito Hen

In Calcio

En La Liga

Rising Sun

References

External links